Aggie is an 2020 American documentary film, directed and produced by Catherine Gund. The film follows the story of art collector Agnes Gund, exploring the nexus of art, race, and justice.

The film had its world premiere at the Sundance Film Festival on January 24, 2020. It was released on October 7, 2020, by Strand Releasing.

Synopsis 
Aggie looks at the upbringing and career of collector and philanthropist Agnes "Aggie" Gund, focusing on when she sold a painting from her collection to fund criminal-justice reform. Roy Lichtenstein's Masterpiece sold for $165 million and Aggie's nonprofit initiative—the Art for Justice Fund—was born, bridging “blue chip” art and serving the common good. Ava DuVernay, Bryan Stevenson, Thelma Golden, John Waters, Glenn Ligon, Jamie Bennett, Abigail Disney, Teresita Fernández and Marina Abramović appear in the film.

Release
The film had its world premiere at the Sundance Film Festival on January 24, 2020. In May 2020, Strand Releasing acquired U.S. distribution rights to the film. It was released on October 7, 2020.

Critical reception 
On Metacritic, the film holds a rating of 57 out of 4, based on 13 critics, indicating "mixed or average reviews".

Ordoga of the Los Angeles Times writes that "Aggie is a well-made portrait of an admirable woman."

References

External links 
 
 
 

American documentary films
2020 documentary films
2020 films
Documentary films about women
Documentary films about racism
2020s English-language films
2020s American films